The Triangle Shirtwaist Factory fire in the Greenwich Village neighborhood of Manhattan, New York City, on Saturday, March 25, 1911, was the deadliest industrial disaster in the history of the city, and one of the deadliest in U.S. history. The fire caused the deaths of 146 garment workers – 123 women and girls and 23 men – who died from the fire, smoke inhalation, or falling or jumping to their deaths. Most of the victims were recent Italian or Jewish immigrant women and girls aged 14 to 23; of the victims whose ages are known, the oldest victim was 43-year-old Providenza Panno, and the youngest were 14-year-olds Kate Leone and Rosaria "Sara" Maltese.

The factory was located on the 8th, 9th, and 10th floors of the Asch Building, which had been built in 1901.  Later renamed the "Brown Building", it still stands at 23–29 Washington Place near Washington Square Park, on the New York University (NYU) campus. The building has been designated a National Historic Landmark and a New York City landmark.

Because the doors to the stairwells and exits were locked – a common practice at the time to prevent workers from taking unauthorized breaks and to reduce theft –  many of the workers could not escape from the burning building and jumped from the high windows. The fire led to legislation requiring improved factory safety standards and helped spur the growth of the International Ladies' Garment Workers' Union (ILGWU), which fought for better working conditions for sweatshop workers.

Background
The Triangle Waist Company factory occupied the 8th, 9th, and 10th floors of the 10-story Asch Building on the northwest corner of Greene Street and Washington Place, just east of Washington Square Park, in the Greenwich Village neighborhood of New York City. Under the ownership of Max Blanck and Isaac Harris, the factory produced women's blouses, known as "shirtwaists". The factory normally employed about 500 workers, mostly young Italian and Jewish immigrant women and girls, who worked nine hours a day on weekdays plus seven hours on Saturdays, earning for their 52 hours of work between $7 and $12 a week, the equivalent of $191 to $327 a week in 2018 currency, or $3.67 to $6.29 per hour.

Fire

At approximately 4:40 pm on Saturday, March 25, 1911, as the workday was ending, a fire flared up in a scrap bin under one of the cutter's tables at the northeast corner of the 8th floor. The first fire alarm was sent at 4:45 pm by a passerby on Washington Place who saw smoke coming from the 8th floor. Both owners of the factory were in attendance and had invited their children to the factory on that afternoon.

The Fire Marshal concluded that the likely cause of the fire was the disposal of an unextinguished match or cigarette butt in a scrap bin containing two months' worth of accumulated cuttings. Beneath the table in the wooden bin were hundreds of pounds of scraps left over from the several thousand shirtwaists that had been cut at that table. The scraps piled up from the last time the bin was emptied, coupled with the hanging fabrics that surrounded it; the steel trim was the only thing that was not highly flammable.

Although smoking was banned in the factory, cutters were known to sneak cigarettes, exhaling the smoke through their lapels to avoid detection. A New York Times article suggested that the fire may have been started by the engines running the sewing machines. A series of articles in Collier's noted a pattern of arson among certain sectors of the garment industry whenever their particular product fell out of fashion or had excess inventory in order to collect insurance. The Insurance Monitor, a leading industry journal, observed that shirtwaists had recently fallen out of fashion, and that insurance for manufacturers of them was "fairly saturated with moral hazard". Although Blanck and Harris were known for having had four previous suspicious fires at their companies, arson was not suspected in this case.

A bookkeeper on the 8th floor was able to warn employees on the 10th floor via telephone, but there was no audible alarm and no way to contact staff on the 9th floor. According to survivor Yetta Lubitz, the first warning of the fire on the 9th floor arrived at the same time as the fire itself.

Although the floor had a number of exits, including two freight elevators, a fire escape, and stairways down to Greene Street and Washington Place, flames prevented workers from descending the Greene Street stairway, and the door to the Washington Place stairway was locked to prevent theft by the workers; the locked doors allowed managers to check the women's purses. Various historians have also ascribed the exit doors being locked to management's wanting to keep out union organizers due to management's anti-union bias. The foreman who held the stairway door key had already escaped by another route. Dozens of employees escaped the fire by going up the Greene Street stairway to the roof. Other survivors were able to jam themselves into the elevators while they continued to operate.

Within three minutes, the Greene Street stairway became unusable in both directions. Terrified employees crowded onto the single exterior fire escape – which city officials had allowed Asch to erect instead of the required third staircase – a flimsy and poorly anchored iron structure that may have been broken before the fire. The remainder waited until smoke and fire overcame them.

The fire department arrived quickly but was unable to stop the flames, as their ladders were only long enough to reach as high as the 7th floor. The fallen bodies and falling victims also made it difficult for the fire department to approach the building.

Elevator operators Joseph Zito and Gaspar Mortillaro saved many lives by traveling three times up to the 9th floor for passengers, but Mortillaro was eventually forced to give up when the rails of his elevator buckled under the heat. Some victims pried the elevator doors open and jumped into the empty shaft, trying to slide down the cables or to land on top of the car. The weight and impacts of these bodies warped the elevator car and made it impossible for Zito to make another attempt. William Gunn Shepard, a reporter at the tragedy, would say that "I learned a new sound that day, a sound more horrible than description can picture – the thud of a speeding living body on a stone sidewalk".

A large crowd of bystanders gathered on the street, witnessing 62 people jumping or falling to their deaths from the burning building. Louis Waldman, later a New York Socialist state assemblyman, described the scene years later:

Aftermath
Although early references of the death toll ranged from 141 to 148, almost all modern references agree that 146 people died as a result of the fire: 123 women and girls and 23 men. Most victims died of burns, asphyxiation, blunt impact injuries, or a combination of the three.

The first person to jump was a man, and another man was seen kissing a young woman at the window before they both jumped to their deaths.

Bodies of the victims were taken to Charities Pier (also called Misery Lane), located at 26th street and the East River, for identification by friends and relatives. Victims were interred in 16 different cemeteries. 22 victims of the fire were buried by the Hebrew Free Burial Association in a special section at Mount Richmond Cemetery. In some instances, their tombstones refer to the fire. Six victims remained unidentified until Michael Hirsch, a historian, completed four years of researching newspaper articles and other sources for missing persons and was able to identify each of them by name. Those six victims were buried together in the Cemetery of the Evergreens in Brooklyn. Originally interred elsewhere on the grounds, their remains now lie beneath a monument to the tragedy, a large marble slab featuring a kneeling woman.

Consequences and legacy

The company's owners, Max Blanck and Isaac Harris – both Jewish immigrants – who survived the fire by fleeing to the building's roof when it began, were indicted on charges of first- and second-degree manslaughter in mid-April; the pair's trial began on December 4, 1911. Max Steuer, counsel for the defendants, managed to destroy the credibility of one of the survivors, Kate Alterman, by asking her to repeat her testimony a number of times, which she did without altering key phrases. Steuer argued to the jury that Alterman and possibly other witnesses had memorized their statements, and might even have been told what to say by the prosecutors. The prosecution charged that the owners knew the exit doors were locked at the time in question. The investigation found that the locks were intended to be locked during working hours based on the findings from the fire, but the defense stressed that the prosecution failed to prove that the owners knew that. The jury acquitted the two men of first- and second-degree manslaughter, but they were found liable of wrongful death during a subsequent civil suit in 1913 in which plaintiffs were awarded compensation in the amount of $75 per deceased victim. The insurance company paid Blanck and Harris about $60,000 more than the reported losses, or about $400 per casualty.

In 1913, Blanck was once again arrested for locking the door in his factory during working hours. He was fined $20 which was the minimum amount the fine could be.

Rose Schneiderman, a prominent socialist and union activist, gave a speech at the memorial meeting held in the Metropolitan Opera House on April 2, 1911, to an audience largely made up of the members of the Women's Trade Union League. She used the fire as an argument for factory workers to organize:

Others in the community, and in particular in the ILGWU, believed that political reform could help. In New York City, a Committee on Public Safety was formed, headed by eyewitness Frances Perkins – who 22 years later would be appointed United States Secretary of Labor – to identify specific problems and lobby for new legislation, such as the bill to grant workers shorter hours in a work week, known as the "54-hour Bill". The committee's representatives in Albany obtained the backing of Tammany Hall's Al Smith, the Majority Leader of the Assembly, and Robert F. Wagner, the Majority Leader of the Senate, and this collaboration of machine politicians and reformers – also known as "do-gooders" or "goo-goos" – got results, especially since Tammany's chief, Charles F. Murphy, realized the goodwill to be had as champion of the downtrodden.

The New York State Legislature then created the Factory Investigating Commission to "investigate factory conditions in this and other cities and to report remedial measures of legislation to prevent hazard or loss of life among employees through fire, unsanitary conditions, and occupational diseases." The Commission was chaired by Wagner and co-chaired by Al Smith. They held a series of widely publicized investigations around the state, interviewing 222 witnesses and taking 3,500 pages of testimony. They hired field agents to do on-site inspections of factories. They started with the issue of fire safety and moved on to broader issues of the risks of injury in the factory environment. Their findings led to thirty-eight new laws regulating labor in New York state, and gave them a reputation as leading progressive reformers working on behalf of the working class. In the process, they changed Tammany's reputation from mere corruption to progressive endeavors to help the workers. New York City's Fire Chief John Kenlon told the investigators that his department had identified more than 200 factories where conditions made a fire like that at the Triangle Factory possible. The State Commissions's reports helped modernize the state's labor laws, making New York State "one of the most progressive states in terms of labor reform." New laws mandated better building access and egress, fireproofing requirements, the availability of fire extinguishers, the installation of alarm systems and automatic sprinklers, better eating and toilet facilities for workers, and limited the number of hours that women and children could work. In the years from 1911 to 1913, 60 of the 64 new laws recommended by the Commission were legislated with the support of Governor William Sulzer.

As a result of the fire, the American Society of Safety Professionals was founded in New York City on October 14, 1911.

The last living survivor of the fire was Rose Freedman, née Rosenfeld, who died in Beverly Hills, California, on February 15, 2001, at the age of 107. She was two days away from her 18th birthday at the time of the fire, which she survived by following the company's executives and being rescued from the roof of the building. As a result of her experience, she became a lifelong supporter of unions.

On September 16, 2019, U.S. Senator Elizabeth Warren delivered a speech in Washington Square Park supporting her presidential campaign, a few blocks from the location of the Triangle Shirtwaist Factory fire. Sen. Warren recounted the story of the fire and its legacy before a crowd of supporters, likening activism for workers' rights following the 1911 fire to her own presidential platform.

Remember the Triangle Fire Coalition

The Remember the Triangle Fire Coalition is an alliance of more than 200 organizations and individuals formed in 2008 to encourage and coordinate nationwide activities commemorating the centennial of the fire and to create a permanent public art memorial to honor its victims. The founding partners included Workers United, the New York City Fire Museum, New York University (the current owner of the building), Workmen's Circle, Museum at Eldridge Street, the Greenwich Village Society for Historic Preservation, the Lower East Side Tenement Museum, the Gotham Center for New York City History, the Bowery Poetry Club and others. Members of the Coalition include arts organizations, schools, workers’ rights groups, labor unions, human rights and women's rights groups, ethnic organizations, historical preservation societies, activists, and scholars, as well as families of the victims and survivors.

The Coalition grew out of a public art project called "Chalk" created by New York City filmmaker Ruth Sergel. Every year beginning in 2004, Sergel and volunteer artists went across New York City on the anniversary of the fire to inscribe in chalk the names, ages, and causes of death of the victims in front of their former homes, often including drawings of flowers, tombstones or a triangle.

Centennial

From July 2009 through the weeks leading up to the 100th anniversary, the Coalition served as a clearinghouse to organize some 200 activities as varied as academic conferences, films, theater performances, art shows, concerts, readings, awareness campaigns, walking tours, and parades that were held in and around New York City, and in cities across the nation, including San Francisco, Los Angeles, Chicago, Minneapolis, Boston and Washington, D.C.

The ceremony, which was held in front of the building where the fire took place, was preceded by a march through Greenwich Village by thousands of people, some carrying shirtwaists – women's blouses – on poles, with sashes commemorating the names of those who died in the fire. Speakers included the United States Secretary of Labor, Hilda L. Solis, U.S. Senator Charles Schumer, New York City Mayor Michael R. Bloomberg, the actor Danny Glover, and Suzanne Pred Bass, the grandniece of Rosie Weiner, a young woman killed in the blaze. Most of the speakers that day called for the strengthening of workers’ rights and organized labor.

At 4:45 pm EST, the moment the first fire alarm was sounded in 1911, hundreds of bells rang out in cities and towns across the nation. For this commemorative act, the Remember the Triangle Fire Coalition organized hundreds of churches, schools, fire houses, and private individuals in the New York City region and across the nation. The Coalition maintains on its website a national map denoting each of the bells that rang that afternoon.

Permanent memorial
The Coalition has launched an effort to create a permanent public art memorial for the Triangle Shirtwaist Factory fire at the site of the 1911 fire in lower Manhattan. 

In 2011, the Coalition established that the goal of the permanent memorial would be:
 To honor the memory of those who died from the fire;
 To affirm the dignity of all workers;
 To value women’s work;
 To remember the movement for worker safety and social justice stirred by this tragedy;
 To inspire future generations of activists

In 2012, the Coalition signed an agreement with NYU that granted the organization permission to install a memorial on the Brown Building and, in consultation with the Landmarks Preservation Commission, indicated what elements of the building could be incorporated into the design. Architectural designer Ernesto Martinez directed an international competition for the design. A jury of representatives from fashion, public art, design, architecture, and labor history reviewed 170 entries from more than 30 countries and selected a spare yet powerful design by Richard Joon Yoo and Uri Wegman. On December 22, 2015, New York Governor Andrew Cuomo announced that $1.5 million from state economic development funds would be earmarked to build the Triangle Fire Memorial. 

The design of the memorial consists of a stainless-steel ribbon that cascades vertically down the corner of the Brown Building (23-29 Washington Place) from the window-sill of the 9th floor, marking the location where most of the victims of the Triangle fire died or jumped to their death. The steel ribbon is etched with patterns and textures from a 300-foot long cloth ribbon, formed from individual pieces of fabric, donated and sewed together by hundreds of volunteers. At the cornice above the first floor, the steel ribbon splits into horizontal bands that run perpendicularly along the east and south facades of the building, floating twelve feet above the sidewalk. The names of all 146 workers who died will be laser-cut through these panels, allowing light to pass through. At street level, an angled panel made of stone glass at hip height will reflect the names overhead. Testimonies from survivors and witnesses will be inscribed in this reflective panel juxtaposing the names and history.

Mt. Zion Cemetery Memorial 
A memorial "of the Ladies Waist and Dress Makers Union Local No 25" was erected in Mt. Zion Cemetery in Maspeth, Queens (40°44'2" N 73°54'11" W).  It is a series of stone columns holding a large cross beam.  Much of the writing is no longer legible due to erosion.

In popular culture
Films and television
 The Crime of Carelessness (1912), 14-minute Thomas A. Edison, Inc., short inspired by the Triangle Factory fire, directed by James Oppenheim
 With These Hands (1950), directed by Jack Arnold
 The Triangle Factory Fire Scandal (1979), directed by Mel Stuart, produced by Mel Brez and Ethel Brez
 American Pop (1981), an adult animated musical drama film written by Ronni Kern and directed by Ralph Bakshi features a scene taking place in the fire.
 Those Who Know Don't Tell: The Ongoing Battle for Workers' Health (1990), produced by Abby Ginzberg, narrated by Studs Terkel
 Episode 4 of Ric Burns' 1999 PBS series New York: A Documentary Film, "The Power and the People (1898–1918)", extensively covered the fire.
 The Living Century: Three Miracles (2001) premiered on PBS, focusing on the life of 107-year-old Rose Freedman (died 2001), who became the last living survivor of the fire.
 American Experience: Triangle Fire (2011), documentary produced and directed by Jamila Wignot, narrated by Michael Murphy
 Triangle: Remembering the Fire (2011) premiered on HBO on March 21, four days short of the 100th anniversary.
 In season 3 episode 7 of SyFy Channel TV show Warehouse 13 (2011), characters Claudia Donovan and Steve Jinks recover an artifact from the Triangle Shirtwaist Factory Fire, a doorknob which burns people.
 In the 2015 season 1 episode 4 of The CW TV sitcom Crazy Ex-Girlfriend, characters Rebecca Bunch and Greg Serrano are on an awkward first date, but then they start to bond after their shared interest in the Triangle Shirtwaist Factory Fire, with Greg calling it his "favorite fire". This foreshadows Rebecca's past as an arsonist.
 The Fire of a Movement (2019) Episode of PBS series The Future of America's Past – "... We visit the building and learn how public outcry inspired workplace safety laws that revolutionized industrial work nationwide. Descendants and activists show us how that work reverberates today."

Music
 "Dos lid fun nokh dem fayer" ("The Song from after the Fire") by Yiddish lyricist Charles Simon, 1912.
 "My Little Shirtwaist Fire" by Rasputina, from their 1996 album Thanks for the Ether.
 "Die Fire Korbunes" (The Fire Victims), music by David Meyerowitz, 1911
 "The Triangle Fire" by The Brandos, from their 2006 album Over the Border.
 "Sweatshop Fire" by Curtis Eller, from his 2008 album Wirewalkers and Assassins.
 "Washington Square", by Si Kahn, from his 2010 album Courage
 Fire in my mouth (2018), a 60-minute oratorio for 146 female voices and orchestra by Julia Wolfe premiered by The Crossing (choral ensemble), The Young People's Chorus of New York City, and The New York Philharmonic under the direction of Jaap van Zweden at David Geffen Hall, Lincoln Center on January 24, 2019.

Theatre and dance
 Naomi Wallace's 1996 play Slaughter City includes a character, the Textile Worker, that was killed in the Triangle Shirtwaist Fire, and the play itself was inspired by several labor events throughout the 20th century, including the fire.
 In Ain Gordon's play Birdseed Bundles (2000), the Triangle fire is a major dramatic engine of the story.
 The musical Rags – book by Joseph Stein, lyrics by Stephen Schwartz, and music by Charles Strouse – incorporates the Triangle Shirtwaist fire in the second act.
 In March 2012, the modern dance concert One Hundred Forty-Six by Denise J. Murphy explored the Triangle Shirtwaist Factory fire through movement, text, video, photography and original music.
 Scintille ("Sparks") is a 2012 Italian political play by Laura Sicignano which centers on the fire and the circumstances surrounding it. 
 Triangle, a stage musical with music by Curtis Moore, lyrics by Thomas Mizer, and book by Thomas Mizer, Curtis Moore and Joshua Scher, deals with the Shirtwaist Factory fire on the 100th anniversary of the tragedy through the eyes of a scientist whose laboratory is located in the Asch Building. The play was premiered at TheatreWorks in Palo Alto, California in July 2015.
 In their 2018 production of A Bintel Brief, a play chronicling the trials of Jewish immigrants to America at the turn of the 20th century, The Dora Wasserman Yiddish Theatre in Montreal, Canada, translated the songs "The Ballad of the Triangle Fire" and Bread and Roses into Yiddish for the first time. The world premiere of these new translations was released as a video in March 2020 to commemorate the anniversary of the fire.

Literature

 Triangle: The Fire That Changed America by David Von Drehle, 2003
 The Triangle Fire by Leon Stein, 1963
 Talking to the Girls: Intimate and Political Essays on the Triangle Shirtwaist Factory Fire edited by Edvige Giunta and Mary Anne Trasciatti, 2022.
 Fragments from the Fire: The Triangle Shirtwaist Company Fire of March 25, 1911, a book of poetry by Chris Llewellyn, 1987.
 Triangle, a 2006 novel by Katharine Weber, tells the story of the last living survivor of the fire, whose story hides the truth of her experience on March 25, 1911, raising the questions of who owns history and whose stories prevail.
 Margaret Peterson Haddix's 2007 historical novel for young adults, Uprising, deals with immigration, women's rights, and the labor movement, with the Triangle Shirtwaist Fire as a central element.
 Esther Friesner's Threads and Flames deals with a young girl, named Raisa, who works at the Triangle Shirtwaist Factory at the time of the fire.
 Deborah Hopkinson's 2004 historical novel for young adults, Hear My Sorrow: The Diary of Angela Denoto.
 Mary Jane Auch's 2004 historical novel for young adults, Ashes of Roses  tells the tale of Margaret Rose Nolan, a young girl who works at the Triangle Shirtwaist Factory at the time of the fire, along with her sister and her friends.
 The comic book The Goon issue No. 37 tells the story of a similar fire at a girdle factory that takes the lives of 142 women who worked there. After the fire, the surviving women attempt to unionize and the Goon comes to their aid after union busters try to force them back to work. Author Eric Powell specifically cites the Triangle Shirtwaist Factory fire as an inspiration for the story.
 Vivian Schurfranz's novel Rachel, from the Sunfire series of historical romances for young adults, is about a Polish Jewish immigrant girl who works at the Triangle Shirtwaist Factory at the time of the fire.
 "Heaven Is Full of Windows", a 2009 short story by Steve Stern, dramatizes the Triangle Shirtwaist Factory fire from the perspective of a Polish Jewish immigrant girl.
 Robert Pinsky's poem Shirt describes the fire.
 "Mayn Rue Platz" (My Resting Place), a poem written by former Triangle employee Morris Rosenfeld, has been set to music, in Yiddish and English, by many artists, including Geoff Berner and June Tabor.
 In Alice Hoffman's novel The Museum of Extraordinary Things, the fire is one of the main elements of the plot.
 "Afterlife", a 2013 short story by Stephen King, centers around Isaac Harris in Purgatory talking about the fire.
 In a section of Edward Rutherfurd's novel New York, a protagonist's sister, from an Italian immigrant family, dies after jumping from a window to escape the fire.
 Sholem Asch's 1946 novel East River tells the story of the Triangle Shirtwaist Factory fire through the eyes of an Irish girl who was working at the factory at a time of the fire.
 Helene Wecker's 2021 novel The Hidden Palace is a historical fantasy that centers around a golem and a jinni living in New York in the early 20th century. The Triangle Shirtwaist Factory fire occurs as an event that affects multiple characters in the novel.

See also

 2012 Dhaka garment factory fire, a similar fire in Bangladesh
 2013 Dhaka garment factory collapse, the deadliest garment-factory disaster in history
 International Women's Day
 List of disasters in New York City by death toll
 List of fires
 Occupational Safety and Health Administration
 Rhinelander Waldo, N.Y.C. Fire Commissioner in 1911
 Women in labor unions

References
Notes

Bibliography
 Argersinger, Jo Ann E. ed. The Triangle Fire: A Brief History with Documents (Macmillan, 2009). xviii, 137 pp.
 
 

Further reading

 
 Chernoff, Alan. "Remembering the Triangle Fire 100 years later". CNN/Money (March 25, 2011)
 
 
 Sosinsky, Leigh (2011). The New York City Triangle Factory Fire. Charleston, South Carolina: Arcadia Publishing.

External links

General
 Chronology of events
 "Triangle Factory Fire", Cornell University Library
List of names of victims at Cornell University Library site
 Triangle Fire Open Archive
 Booknotes interview with David Von Drehle on Triangle: The Fire That Changed America (October 5, 2003)
 Triangle Fire – An American Experience Documentary

Contemporaneous accounts
 A collection of articles from The New York Call at marxists.org
 "Eyewitness at the Triangle"
 1911 McClure Magazine article (see pages 455–483)

Trial
 Complete Transcript Of Triangle Trial: People Vs. Isaac Harris and Max Blanck
 "Famous Trials: The Triangle Shirtwaist Fire Trial"
 1912 New York Court record (see pp. 48–50)
 Witnesses Who Testified at the Trial

Articles
 "Triangle Shirtwaist Factory Building", National Park Service
 "Remembering the Triangle Fire", The Jewish Daily Forward
 "Coming Full Circle on Triangle Factory Fire", The Jewish Daily Forward
 Remembering Triangle, Jacobin Magazine

Memorials and centennial
 Remember the Triangle Fire Coalition 1911–2011
 Conference: "Out of the Smoke and the Flame: The Triangle Shirtwaist Fire and its Legacy"
 CHALK: annual community commemoration
 Rosenfeld's Requiem, a poem about the victims of the fire by Morris Rosenfeld first published in The Jewish Daily Forward on March 29, 1911
 Triangle Returns. Institute for Global Labour and Human Rights, March 22, 2011

 
1911 disasters in the United States
1911 fires in the United States
1911 in New York City
1911 industrial disasters
Building and structure fires in New York City
Burials at Mount Zion Cemetery (New York City)
Fire disasters involving barricaded escape routes
Clothing industry disasters
Greenwich Village
History of labor relations in the United States
Industrial fires
Industrial fires and explosions in the United States
Factory fires
Italian-American culture in New York City
Italian-American history
Jewish-American history
Jews and Judaism in New York City
March 1911 events
Organizations based in New York City
Progressive Era in the United States
Fires in New York City
International Ladies Garment Workers Union
High-rise fires